Bajada or La Bajada are derived from Spanish, meaning "the descent", and may refer to:

People
Anthony Bajada (born 1902), British American inventor of the “stay tab” press-to-open lid mechanism for drink cans
Clint Bajada (born 1982), Maltese TV and radio personality
Emilio Bajada (born 1914), Italian Mathematician
Toni Bajada (16th century), Maltese spy
Roderick Bajada (born 1983), Maltese footballer
Shaun Bajada (born 1983), Maltese footballer

Places
 La Bajada, Catamarca, Argentina
 La Bajada, Dallas, Texas, United States
 La Bajada, New Mexico, United States (and the escarpment of the Caja del Rio)
 La Bajada, San Luis, Argentina

Other
Bajada (festival) a festival common to the Canary islands
Bajada (geography), a compound alluvial fan